Mehriz County is in Yazd province, Iran. The capital of the county is the city of Mehriz. At the 2006 census, the county's population was 43,363 in 11,855 households. The following census in 2011 counted 44,126 people in 13,073 households. At the 2016 census, the county's population was 51,733 in 15,978 households.

Administrative divisions

The population history of Mehriz County's administrative divisions over three consecutive censuses is shown in the following table. The latest census shows one district, five rural districts, and one city.

References

 

Counties of Yazd Province